William Frederick Voss (December 23, 1847November 2, 1921) was a German American immigrant, banker, and politician.  He was the 25th and 27th mayor of Watertown, Wisconsin, and represented Dodge County in the Wisconsin State Senate during the 1891 and 1893 sessions.

Biography
William Voss was born on December 23, 1847, in Berlin, in what was then the Kingdom of Prussia.  He emigrated to the United States with his parents in 1850.  They first resided in Milwaukee for two years, then came to Watertown, Wisconsin, in 1852.  He was educated at the public schools of Watertown, but by the time of his graduation in 1863, both his parents were dead.

As the eldest of four siblings, Voss took it upon himself to support the family.  The day after his graduation, he walked to Columbus, Wisconsin, and secured temporary employment as a farmhand.  He quickly transitioned to work as a clerk at the grocery store William Volkmann & Co., and worked there for three years.  He then went to Cincinnati, Ohio, and worked for two years for John Schillito & Company.

He returned to Watertown in the employment of Justus T. Moak, and when Moak was appointed postmaster at Watertown in 1867, he designated Voss as his deputy.  He worked with Moak for several years, and then determined to prospect for gold in Colorado.  He ultimately abandoned that goal, but worked on a farm for about two years near Denver before returning to Wisconsin.

In the Spring of 1874, he was hired as bank teller for the Wisconsin National Bank.  He remained with the bank for most of the rest of his career, and later became president of the bank.  He was elected to the Watertown city council in 1879, 1880, 1881, and 1882, and was then elected mayor in 1886, 1887, 1888, and 1889.

In 1890, he was elected to the Wisconsin State Senate, running on the Democratic Party ticket.  He represented Wisconsin's 13th State Senate district, which then comprised all of Dodge County.  In the Senate, he was chairman of the committee on banking and currency, and was also a member of the committee on railroads.  While serving as senator, he was elected to three more terms as mayor, in 1892, 1893, and 1894.

Voss was a member of the school board in Watertown on and off throughout his life, and served two long stretches as president of the school board.  He was also president of the library board and secretary of the waterworks board.

Voss worked as president of the Wisconsin National Bank until his death.

Personal life and family
William F. Voss was the eldest surviving child of Frederick Voss.  His mother died in 1856 and his father in 1861.

They would have five children, all of whom survived him.

Electoral history

Wisconsin Senate (1890)

| colspan="6" style="text-align:center;background-color: #e9e9e9;"| General Election, November 4, 1890

References

External links

1847 births
1921 deaths
People from Berlin
Prussian emigrants to the United States
Politicians from Watertown, Wisconsin
Democratic Party Wisconsin state senators
Mayors of places in Wisconsin
Wisconsin city council members
Wisconsin postmasters